Qiu Jie (born 1961) is a Chinese artist working in Switzerland, France and China. He was born in Shanghai, China.

Style

Qiu Jie weaves together Western pop culture and advertising with Chinese iconography to create intricate, internationally acclaimed pencil drawings.

Exhibitions

The solo exhibitions of Qiu Jie include:

 1985 Palace of Culture, Xu Hui, Shanghai
 1992 Museum of Fine Arts, Shanghai (with Shen Fan)
 1992 OP.ERA Gallery, Geneva
 1994 Andata/Ritorno Gallery, Geneva
 1998 Crosnier Hall, Palais de l'Athénée, Geneva
 1998 Martin Krebs Gallery, Bern
 1999 "UQS 1" arcade space, Zurich
 1999 "UQS 2" Artamis Stargazer Gallery, Zurich (with Tomas Schunke)
 2000 Museum of Contemporary Art, Basel (with Ai Wei Wei)
 2000 The BF15 space for contemporary art, Lyon
 2004 Martin Krebs Gallery, Bern (with J. F. Luthy and P. Stoffel)
 2004 Centre d'art en l'île, Geneva
 2006 Leda Fletcher Gallery, Geneva
 2013 Art Plural Gallery, Singapore

He has also participated in group shows including:

 1999 Change Directory: Kunsthalle, Bern
 1999 Somewhere one: Attitudes - contemporary arts space, Geneva
 2001 Mai 1968: Museum of Modern and Contemporary Art, Geneva
 2003 Colours make the wall: Factory Secheron, Geneva
 2004 Art of Shanghai: Gallery Leda Fletcher
 2005 Discover-Rediscover: Rath Museum, Geneva
 2006 Shanghai Biennale: Museum of Contemporary Art, Shanghai

Education
 1994 École Supérieure des Beaux-Arts, Genève, Switzerland (now HEAD – Genève, Haute école d'art et de design / Geneva University of Art and Design)
1981 Shanghai Art Installation School, China

References

Living people
1961 births
Painters from Shanghai

Alumni of the École Supérieure des Beaux-Arts, Genève